John Chandler (February 1, 1762September 25, 1841) was an American politician and soldier of Maine. The political career of Chandler, a Democratic-Republican, was interspersed with his involvement in the state militia during both the American Revolutionary War and the War of 1812.

Biography

Family background 
Chandler was born in Epping in the Province of New Hampshire. He was one of 10 children and the third-oldest son of Joseph Chandler (1725–1776) and his wife Lydia (née Eastman; 1726–1820). His father Joseph was a blacksmith. He fought in the French and Indian War and was a captain in the Revolutionary War. He died at Mount Independence in 1776.

American Revolutionary War 
Chandler was self-educated and enlisted in the Continental Army at age 15. In the same year he was captured by the British, but he soon escaped. In May 1779 he was captured again. In September, he was able to escape and made his way back to Epping. Immediately he reenlisted in the Continental Army. During the war he had become the protégé of General Henry Dearborn, (1751–1829), a future fifth U.S. Secretary of War (1801–1809), who was also an important commander of the Northeast sector at Fort Detroit, in the Old Northwest Territory, but a terrible failure during the War of 1812.

On August 27, 1783, Chandler married Mary Whittier, with which he had seven children (three sons and four daughters).

Politician in Massachusetts 
After the end of the war, Chandler was both illiterate and without money. However, he borrowed money from Dearborn and bought a farm near Monmouth in the District of Maine, then a part of Massachusetts. He settled there with his family in 1784. A local schoolmaster gave him all the support he needed to catch up on his schooling quickly. He worked hard as a blacksmith, prospered over the years and became a respected member of the community.

From 1803 to 1805, Chandler served in the Massachusetts Senate; he later was elected to the U.S. House of Representatives as a Democratic-Republican, serving from March 4, 1805 to March 3, 1809. Chandler was not a candidate for renomination in 1808. In the same year he was appointed Sheriff of Kennebec County. On February 27, 1812 he became major general of the Massachusetts Militia.

War of 1812 
At the outbreak of the War of 1812, President James Madison appointed Chandler to the command of the 17th division. This was a brigade of U.S. Volunteers, troops recruited for one year of service. At this moment he was still major general of the Massachusetts Militia. On July 8, 1812, he resigned his militia office and was commissioned as a brigadier general of the United States Army. The first part of the war he was serving under Major General Henry Dearborn as the commander of one of three brigades of the Army of the North.

At the beginning of June 1813 he accompanied Brigadier General William H. Winder during the Niagara campaign on an advance into Canada. At the Battle of Stoney Creek Chandler was wounded, and both he and Winder were captured, when they wandered into the British line, thinking it was their own. In 1814 he was set free in an exchange of prisoners. Chandler subsequently served defending the coast of New Hampshire and Maine, coordinating efforts between the local militia and federal units. After the war ended, he returned to politics as a member of the Massachusetts General Court in 1819.

Later years 
Chandler was the first president of the Maine Senate and a member of the Maine Constitutional Convention. Upon the admission of Maine to the Union, Chandler was elected to the U.S. Senate. Chandler began his term on June 14, 1820, and was reelected in 1823. During his time in the Senate, Chandler was the chairman of the Committee on Militia during the 18th through 20th Congresses and played a key role in establishing the arsenal at Augusta, as well as the construction of the military road from Bangor to Houlton. He resigned on March 3, 1829, to become the customs collector of Portland, a post he held until 1837. Chandler was a trustee of Bowdoin College from 1821 - 1838. He died in Augusta at age 79 and was buried in Mount Pleasant Cemetery.

References

Further reading 
 George Foster Talbot: General John Chandler, of Monmouth, Me., with Extracts from his Autobiography. in Collections of the Maine Historical Society, Maine Historical Society, 1887 (Vol. 9)

External links 
 
 Past Presidents of the Senate

1762 births
1841 deaths
People from Epping, New Hampshire
American people of English descent
Democratic-Republican Party members of the United States House of Representatives from the District of Maine
Democratic-Republican Party United States senators from Maine
Jacksonian United States senators from Maine
Democratic Party United States senators from Maine
Maine Democratic-Republicans
Maine Jacksonians
Presidents of the Maine Senate
People from Monmouth, Maine
American military personnel of the War of 1812
War of 1812 prisoners of war held by the United Kingdom
American militia generals
United States Army generals
Members of the United States House of Representatives from Massachusetts